In 1968, the United States FBI, under Director J. Edgar Hoover, continued for a nineteenth year to maintain a public list of the people it regarded as the Ten Most Wanted Fugitives.

The FBI began the year 1968 with almost a clean slate for the top Ten list, as only one Top Tenner Fugitive on the list was a true multi-year long-timer still at large.  The remaining nine fugitives on the list were all from the prior year:

 1965 #203 (three years), John William Clouser remained still at large
 1967 #243 (one year), Monroe Hickson declared deceased by January 30, 1968
 1967 #246 (one year), Gordon Dale Ervin remained still at large
 1967 #250 (one year), Carmen Raymond Gagliardi arrested December 23, 1968
 1967 #256 (five months), Jerry Ray James arrested January 24, 1968
 1967 #257 (four months), Richard Paul Anderson arrested January 19, 1968
 1967 #258 (four months), Henry Theodore Young arrested January 9, 1968
 1967 #259 (five months), Donald Eugene Sparks arrested January 24, 1968
 1967 #260 (one month), Zelma Lavone King arrested January 30, 1968
 1967 #261 (three months), Jerry Reece Peacock arrested March 5, 1968

Even then, the FBI managed to clear most of this list through arrests very early in the year, and so by year end, the FBI had amazingly listed an additional thirty-two new Fugitives in 1968, by far surpassing the long-standing previous record of twenty-four additions from 1953.  The huge number of new listings in 1968 capped a decade-long streak of double-digit additions to the list, and really ended the era of frequent listings and quick captures by the FBI.

1968 also brought the first woman to the list, Ruth Eisemann-Schier, at the end of the year.  1968 also saw the second and third "Special 
Additions," to the list (temporarily bringing the total wanted Fugitive count to eleven).  One was Schier's partner, Gary Steven Krist, and the other was James Earl Ray, the infamous fugitive assassin of Martin Luther King Jr.

1968 fugitives

The Ten Most Wanted Fugitives listed by the FBI in 1968 include (in FBI list appearance sequence order):

Ronald Eugene Storck
January 19, 1968 #262
One month on the list
Ronald Eugene Storck – U.S. prisoner arrested February 29, 1968, in Honolulu, Hawaii.

Robert Leon McCain
January 31, 1968 #263
Three weeks on the list
Robert Leon McCain – U.S. prisoner arrested February 23, 1968, in Gulfport, Florida, by local police. A police sergeant who had recently finished a training course at the FBI Academy in Quantico, Virginia recognized McCain from the "Top Ten" flyers displayed there.

William Garrin Allen II
February 9, 1968 #264
One month on the list
William Garrin Allen II – U.S. prisoner arrested March 23, 1968, in Brooklyn, New York.

Charles Lee Herron
February 9, 1968 #265
Eighteen years on the list; by 1982, he had surpassed the previous record of fourteen years set back in 1964
Charles Lee Herron – U.S. prisoner arrested June 18, 1986, in Jacksonville, Florida.

Leonard Daniel Spears
February 13, 1968 #266
Two weeks on the list
Leonard Daniel Spears – U.S. prisoner arrested March 2, 1968, in Tampa, Florida.

William Howard Bornman
February 13, 1968 #267
One day on the list
William Howard Bornman – U.S. prisoner arrested February 13, 1968, in Covington, Kentucky.

John Conway Patterson
February 26, 1968 #268
Three weeks on the list
John Conway Patterson – U.S. prisoner arrested March 17, 1968, in Milwaukee, Wisconsin, by local police and his identity confirmed by fingerprints.

Troy Denver Martin
March 9, 1968 #269
One week on the list
Troy Denver Martin – U.S. prisoner arrested March 19, 1968, in Seattle, Washington, after an employment agency manager recognized him from his Identification Order.

George Benjamin Williams
March 18, 1968 #270
Two months on the list
George Benjamin Williams – found murdered May 26, 1968, his skeletal remains found by prospectors near a mine in Nevada, with three bullet holes in his skull. Williams had been dead for six months.

Michael John Sanders
March 21, 1968 #271
Two weeks on the list
Michael John Sanders – U.S. prisoner arrested April 8, 1968, in New York City.

Howard Callens Johnson
March 21, 1968 #272
One month on the list
Howard Callens Johnson – U.S. prisoner arrested April 24, 1968, in Louisville, Kentucky, after a citizen recognized him
from a wanted poster.

George Edward Wells
March 28, 1968 #273
One year on the list
George Edward Wells – U.S. prisoner arrested May 27, 1969, outside a motel in South Point, Ohio, by FBI Agents.

David Evans
April 3, 1968 #274
One month on the list
David Evans – U.S. prisoner arrested April 26, 1968, in Philadelphia, Pennsylvania, after being shot twice by local police as they responded to a burglar alarm at a doctor's home.

Franklin Allen Paris
April 9, 1968 #275
One month on the list
Franklin Allen Paris – U.S. prisoner arrested May 21, 1968, in Lakehead, California.

David Stuart Neff
April 18, 1968 #276
One week on the list
David Stuart Neff – U.S. prisoner arrested April 25, 1968, in Brooklyn, New York.

James Earl Ray
April 20, 1968 #277, & also June 11, 1977 #351
Two months on the list, the second "Special Addition"
James Earl Ray – deceased in prison;  was a U.S. prisoner, and a British prisoner, apprehended June 8, 1968, in London, England, by British authorities for the assassination of Martin Luther King Jr.

John Wesley Shannon, Jr.
May 7, 1968 #278
One month on the list
John Wesley Shannon, Jr. – U.S. prisoner arrested June 5, 1968, in Camden, New Jersey, by FBI agents and local police.

Taylor Morris Teaford
May 10, 1968 #279
Four years on the list
Taylor Morris Teaford – PROCESS DISMISSED May 24, 1972, in Fresno, California.

Phillip Morris Jones
June 5, 1968 #280
Three weeks on the list
Phillip Morris Jones – U.S. prisoner surrendered June 26, 1968, at the FBI office in San Mateo, California, after seeing wanted poster in a local post office. At the time of his
arrest, he had a fully loaded automatic pistol in his possession.

Johnny Ray Smith
June 20, 1968 #281
Four days on the list
Johnny Ray Smith – U.S. prisoner arrested June 24, 1968, in Ocean Springs, Mississippi, after a citizen recognized him
from a newspaper article.

Byron James Rice
July 5, 1968 #282
Four years on the list
Byron James Rice – U.S. prisoner surrendered October 2, 1972, to the Chicago FBI Field Office following intensive FBI investigative pressure on his acquaintances.

Robert LeRoy Lindblad
July 11, 1968 #283
Three months on the list
Robert Leroy Lindblad – U.S. prisoner surrendered October 7, 1968, to the District Attorney of Lyon County, Nevada, in
Yerington, Nevada.

James Joseph Scully
July 15, 1968 #284
One week on the list
James Joseph Scully – U.S. prisoner arrested July 23, 1968, in Arcadia, California, by FBI agents and local police. He had robbed over 10 banks and shot and wounded a bank teller before being caught.

Billy Ray White
August 13, 1968 #285
Four days on the list
Billy Ray White – U.S. prisoner arrested August 17, 1968.
White was arrested after a citizen recognized him from an article in the St. Louis Globe-Democrat newspaper.

Frederick Rudolph Yokom
August 29, 1968 #286
One week on the list
Frederick Rudolph Yokom – U.S. prisoner arrested September 17, 1968, in Wood River, Illinois, after a citizen recognized him.

Harold James Evans
September 19, 1968 #287
Four months on the list
Harold James Evans – U.S. prisoner arrested January 2, 1969, in Chicago, Illinois.

Robert Lee Carr
October 18, 1968 #288
Three weeks on the list
Robert Lee Carr – U.S. prisoner arrested November 4, 1968, in South Gate, California, after a citizen recognized him from
a wanted flyer.

Levi Washington
November 15, 1968 #289
Three weeks on the list
Levi Washington – U.S. prisoner arrested December 5, 1968, in Jackson, Michigan, for a local bank robbery. A fingerprint comparison revealed his true identity.

Richard Lee Tingler
May 19, 1968 #290
Five months on the list
Richard Lee Tingler – U.S. prisoner arrested May 19, 1968, in Washita County, Oklahoma, by local police.

George Michael Gentile
June 18, 1968 #291
Six months on the list
George Michael Gentile – U.S. prisoner arrested December 17, 1968, in New York City by local police.

Gary Steven Krist
December 20, 1968 #292
Two days on the list, third "Special Addition" ever added to the list
Gary Steven Krist – U.S. prisoner arrested December 22, 1968, in Punta Gorda, Florida, by FBI and local police. Krist and his partner, Ruth Eisemann Schier (Fugitive #293) were later indicted on Georgia state charges of kidnapping with ransom.

Ruth Eisemann-Schier
December 28, 1968 #293
Three months on the list, the first woman ever added to the list
Ruth Eisemann-Schier – U.S. prisoner arrested March 5, 1969, in Norman, Oklahoma, by FBI agents. Ruth Eisemann Schier and her partner, Gary Steven Krist (Fugitive #292), were later indicted on Georgia state charges of kidnapping with ransom.

See also

Later entries
FBI Ten Most Wanted Fugitives, 2020s
FBI Ten Most Wanted Fugitives, 2010s
FBI Ten Most Wanted Fugitives, 2000s
FBI Ten Most Wanted Fugitives, 1990s
FBI Ten Most Wanted Fugitives, 1980s
FBI Ten Most Wanted Fugitives, 1970s
FBI Ten Most Wanted Fugitives, 1960s

Prior entries
FBI Ten Most Wanted Fugitives, 1950s

References

External links
Current FBI top ten most wanted fugitives at FBI site
FBI pdf source document listing all Ten Most Wanted year by year (removed by FBI)

1968 in the United States